Vladimir Margania (8 February 1928 – 6 September 1958) was a Georgian and Soviet football player. He was a reserve goalkeeper of the Soviet Union football team that took part in the 1952 Summer Olympics.

Margania died in a car accident at the age of 30.

References

External links
  Footballfacts Profile
  Dinamo Tbilisi Profile

1928 births
1958 deaths
Soviet footballers
Footballers from Georgia (country)
Association football goalkeepers
FC Dinamo Tbilisi players
Soviet Top League players
Road incident deaths in the Soviet Union